Turbolidium is a genus of sea snails, marine gastropod mollusks in the family Pyramidellidae, the pyrams and their allies.

Species
Species within the genus Turbolidium include:
 Turbolidium franciscoi (Peñas & Rolán, 1997)
 Turbolidium qenenoji (Peñas & Rolán, 2010)
 †Turbolidium schroederi (Wissema, 1947): the type species, known from the Pleistocene of Sumatra
 Turbolidium uniliratum (Bush, 1899)
 Turbolidium uniliratum (Saurin, 1959): the names Turbolidium uniliratum (Bush, 1899) and Turbolidium uniliratum (Saurin, 1959) are secondary homonyms.

References

 Robba E. (2013) Tertiary and Quaternary fossil pyramidelloidean gastropods of Indonesia. Scripta Geologica 144: 1-191.

External links
 To World Register of Marine Species

Pyramidellidae